Slaughter of the Soul is the fourth studio album by Swedish melodic death metal band At the Gates, released on November 14, 1995. It was their last album before their eleven-year breakup from 1996 to 2007. Slaughter of the Soul is considered a landmark in melodic death metal and played a major role in popularizing the Gothenburg scene, alongside The Jester Race by In Flames and The Gallery by Dark Tranquillity. The album was recorded and mixed in Studio Fredman, early 1995.

Andy LaRocque's neo-classical guest solo on "Cold" was widely acclaimed as one of the greatest metal solos and guitarist Anders Björler admitted in 2007 that he still could not play it properly.

"Blinded by Fear" was covered by The Haunted (composed largely of ex-At the Gates members) on their Japanese version of their live/double disc album, Live Rounds in Tokyo and was also covered by Fleshgod Apocalypse on their Mafia EP. The song also appeared in the game Rock Band 2 as downloadable content.

Musical appearances 
Tracks from the album have made appearances in several video games.

 "Blinded by Fear" was made available as downloadable content for the Rock Band video game series on March 28, 2008. Later, it was included in the game's retail "Metal Track Pack" add-on content disc, released on September 22, 2009 in North America. The song is considered one of the most difficult songs in the series to perform on drums, due to its fast tempo.
 The title track is featured in both Grand Theft Auto IV: The Lost and Damned and Tony Hawk's Proving Ground.

Reissues 
A 2002 Reissue contained 11 tracks from the original 1995 release of Slaughter of the Soul, plus 6 bonus audio tracks. Three of the bonus tracks were cover songs, two were demo tracks, and 1 was a previously unreleased track, recorded during the Slaughter of the Soul sessions. The 2006 reissue contained everything from the 2002 reissue, but also included an additional bonus DVD, which featured a 35-minute behind-the-scenes documentary as the highlight. The 2008 reissue contains everything from the 2002 and 2006 rereleases (all audio and DVD material), as well as additional DVD footage—an eight-song live set, recorded in Kraków, Poland on December 30, 1995.

Reception

Critical reception 

Reviews for Slaughter of the Soul have been mostly positive. AllMusic's Steve Huey awarded the album five stars and called it an "excellent example of Gothenburg-style melodic death metal, and certainly the band's best and most focused album to date."

Rock Hard, however, thinks the band has become interchangeable with its many clones, and Deathmetal.org labels it At the Gates' sellout album, sounding like "Metallica attempting ...And Justice For All in a stylistic mashup between Iron Maiden and Judas Priest during Painkiller."

Accolades 
In 2005, the album was ranked number 300 in Rock Hard magazine's book of The 500 Greatest Rock & Metal Albums of All Time. Metal Injection ranked Slaughter of the Soul eighth on their list "Top 10 Influential Heavy Metal Albums". The album was inducted into the Decibel Magazine Hall of Fame in March 2005, being the second album overall to receive such award.
In 2017, Rolling Stone ranked Slaughter of the Soul as 79th on their list of "The 100 Greatest Metal Albums of All Time".

Track listing

Credits 
Writing, performance and production credits are adapted from the album's liner notes.

Personnel

At the Gates 
 Tomas Lindberg − vocals
 Anders Björler − guitar, phaser drums on "Into the Dead Sky"
 Martin Larsson − guitar
 Jonas Björler − bass
 Adrian Erlandsson − drums

Guest musicians 
 Andy LaRocque − guitar solo on "Cold"

Production 
 Fredrik Nordström − production
 At the Gates – co-production
 Noel Summerville − mastering

Artwork and design 
 Kristian Wåhlin − artwork, logo
 Absolute Design Associates – additional artwork and layout
 Frequent Form – logo concept

Studios 
 Studio Fredman, Gothenburg, Sweden – recording, mixing
 Transfermation – mastering

Charts

References

External links 
 
 Slaughter of the Soul at At the Gates's official website
 Slaughter of the Soul at Earache Records

1995 albums
Albums recorded at Studio Fredman
Albums with cover art by Kristian Wåhlin
At the Gates albums
Earache Records albums
Albums produced by Fredrik Nordström